John McCabe may refer to:

John McCabe (composer) (1939–2015), British composer and classical pianist
John McCabe (writer) (1920–2005), Shakespearean scholar and biographer
Christopher John McCabe (born 1967), British biologist and novelist who writes as John McCabe
John F. McCabe, American judge on the D.C. Superior Court
John Ignatius McCabe (1926–2001), Roman Catholic priest and theologian under the name Herbert McCabe
John J. McCabe (1954–1969), murdered after attending a Knights of Columbus dance in Lowell, Massachusetts
John McCabe (jockey), thoroughbred racing jockey who won the 1914 Kentucky Derby